Zashkiv is a village not far from Lviv in Lviv Raion (district) of Lviv Oblast (region) in western Ukraine. It belongs to Lviv urban hromada, one of the hromadas of Ukraine.

History 

First written mention comes from the 1377 (14th century). Then  belonged to the Polish–Lithuanian Commonwealth, from 1772 until 1918 to Austrian (Habsburg monarchy, Austrian Empire, Austria-Hungary) empires, in 1918–1919 to West Ukrainian People's Republic. From 1991 belonged to Ukraine.

Reading room of Ukrainian society Prosvita operated in the village.

Until 18 July 2020, Zashkiv belonged to Zhovkva Raion. The raion was abolished in July 2020 as part of the administrative reform of Ukraine, which reduced the number of raions of Lviv Oblast to seven. The area of Zhovkva Raion was merged into Lviv Raion.

Attractions 
 Church of St. Michael the Archangel (1908)

People 
 Yevhen Konovalets - a military commander of the UNR army and the leader of the Organization of Ukrainian Nationalists between 1929 and 1938.
 Myron Konovalets, brother of Yevhen Konovalets, buried at the Munich Waldfriedhof.

References

External links 
 Zashkiv, google maps 
 

Villages in Lviv Raion